Beltheca is a genus of moth in the family Gelechiidae.

Species
 Beltheca oni Kawahara & Adamski, 2006
 Beltheca phosphoropa (Meyrick, 1922)
 Beltheca picolella Busck, 1914 [=Anterethista heteractis Meyrick, 1914]

References

 Kawahara, A.Y.; Adamski, D. 2006: Taxonomic and behavioral studies of a new dancing Beltheca Busck (Lepidoptera: Gelechiidae) from Costa Rica. Proceedings of the Entomological Society of Washington, 108(2): 253-260. BHL

Anacampsinae